In probability theory, Slepian's lemma (1962), named after David Slepian, is a Gaussian comparison inequality.

the following inequality holds for all real numbers :

or equivalently,

While this intuitive-seeming result is true for Gaussian processes, it is not in general true for other random variables—not even those with expectation 0.

As a corollary, if  is a centered stationary Gaussian process such that  for all , it holds for any real number  that

History
Slepian's lemma was first proven by Slepian in 1962, and has since been used in reliability theory, extreme value theory and areas of pure probability. It has also been re-proven in several different forms.

References
 Slepian, D. "The One-Sided Barrier Problem for Gaussian Noise", Bell System Technical Journal (1962), pp 463–501.
 Huffer, F. "Slepian's inequality via the central limit theorem", Canadian Journal of Statistics (1986), pp 367–370.
 Ledoux, M., Talagrand, M. "Probability in Banach Spaces", Springer Verlag, Berlin 1991, pp 75.

Lemmas